James Stevens may refer to:

James Stevens (Connecticut politician) (1768–1835), United States Representative from Connecticut
James G. Stevens (1822–1906), Scottish-born lawyer, judge and political figure in New Brunswick
James Stevens (New York politician) (1836–1912), New York state politician
J. A. Stevens (James Algernon Stevens, 1873–1934), British customs officer in India
James M. Stevens (1873–1937), Lieutenant Governor of Idaho, 1903–1905
Jim Stevens (baseball) (1889–1966), American baseball player
James Stevens (writer) (1892–1971), American writer and songwriter
James Norman Stevens (1910–1993), English cricketer
James Hay Stevens (1913–1973), British aviation journalist and pilot
James A. Stevens (fl. 1949–1967), American college football coach
James Stevens (composer) (1923–2012), English composer
James C. Stevens (born 1953), American chemist at the Dow Chemical Company
James Thomas Stevens (born 1966), American poet and academic
James Stevens (Australian politician) (born 1983), member of the Australian House of Representatives for Sturt
James Stevens (soccer) (born 1984), American soccer player
James Stevens (footballer) (born 1992), English footballer
James Stevens, aka The Consultant, character used by the music group Cardiacs
 James Stevens, protagonist of the novel The Remains of the Day

See also
James Stephens (disambiguation)
Jimmy Stevens (disambiguation)
Jamie Stevens (born 1989), English footballer